Faisal Ali Al-Dakhil, also spelled Al-Dakheel (born 13 August 1957) is a Kuwaiti footballer.

Al-Dakhil was among the Kuwaiti players who won the 1980 Asian Cup. He played four matches for Kuwait at the 1980 Summer Olympics with three goals in only one match against Nigeria the July 21 in Dynamo Stadion in Moscow.

Al-Dakhil played with Al-Qadsiya Club

Club career statistics

International goals
only in AFC Asian Cup and World Cup Finals

Honours

Club
Qadsia
 Kuwaiti Premier League: 1972–73, 1974–75, 1975–76, 1977–78
 Kuwait Emir Cup:1973–74, 1974–75, 1978–79, 1988–89

International
 AFC Asian Cup: 1980

Regional
 Arabian Gulf Cup: 1976, 1986

References

External links
Faisal al-Dakhil-International Goals

1957 births
Living people
Kuwaiti footballers
Kuwait international footballers
1976 AFC Asian Cup players
1980 AFC Asian Cup players
1982 FIFA World Cup players
1984 AFC Asian Cup players
AFC Asian Cup-winning players
Olympic footballers of Kuwait
Footballers at the 1980 Summer Olympics
Sportspeople from Kuwait City
Association football forwards
Qadsia SC players
Kuwait Premier League players